The Red Hot Chili Peppers 2013/2014 Tour was a concert tour by Red Hot Chili Peppers. The tour followed the band's almost two-year-long I'm with You World Tour which ended in April 2013. The tour featured many festival performances and included the band's first ever shows in Alaska, Paraguay, the Philippines and Puerto Rico. The band also performed in New York City for the first time since 2003 and gave a controversial performance during the halftime show of Super Bowl XLVIII, which was seen by a record-breaking 115.3 million viewers worldwide. During the tour, the band started work on their eleventh studio album in February 2014.

Background
In May, the band gave a special performance for Dalai Lama at the Dalai Lama Environmental Summit. The tour will also feature the band's very first shows in Alaska, where they had previously attempted to perform four times on the One Hot Minute Tour in 1997 however were forced to cancel due to various problems including injuries, scheduling conflicts and drug problems. Tickets for the Alaska show were in such high demand, selling out in three hours which prompted the band to schedule another show there. They will also make their first trip since September 2011 to Brazil and will perform their first ever show in Paraguay.

Prior to their two Alaskan dates, the band performed a private birthday party at the million dollar mansion of Lululemon founder Chip Wilson in Vancouver.

The band performed a special benefit concert in October for Flea's Silverlake Conservatory of Music which was hosted by Flea and Kiedis and featured a special headlining performance by Neil Young. A silent auction was held and also featured donations from Marc Jacobs, Tony Hawk, Pearl Jam, Gucci and others. The band also announced their very first show ever in Puerto Rico which took place on April 6, 2014.

The band was one of the main headliners at the 2014 Isle of Wight Festival on June 14, 2014. This was the band's only UK and Ireland appearance in 2014 and will mark the band's first UK festival since 2007. The band said of performing at the legendary festival "To headline the Isle of Wight Festival is a once in a lifetime opportunity, following in the footsteps of Jimi Hendrix and The Doors. When we were offered the slot, we jumped at the chance. We intend to make it really special."

The band gave a surprise unannounced performance on the May 22, 2014, episode of The Tonight Show Starring Jimmy Fallon. Chad Smith and actor Will Ferrell competed in a drum-off and were joined by Kiedis, Flea and Klinghoffer for a performance of "Don't Fear the Reaper" with Ferrell playing cowbell. The Chili Peppers were later joined by The Roots for a performance of Parliament Funkadelic's "Standing on the Verge of Getting it On" and "Give it Away".

The final show on the tour at the Isle of Wight festival was cut short by four songs due to the band taking the stage 15 minutes late and local curfew laws.

Anthony Kiedis security guard scuffle
On June 21, 2013, and prior to Chili Peppers show that night in Delaware, Anthony Kiedis, who along with his tour manager, Gage Freeman and a female friend were attempting to enter the Four Seasons hotel in Philadelphia to see the Rolling Stones before they left for their own concert when a security guard mistook Kiedis for a fan and made an attempt to block him from entering. A scuffle broke out with the guard attempting to slam Kiedis to the ground with hotel security, Freeman and a bystander coming to his aid. After a brief discussion with the guard and hotel security, Kiedis and the guard shook hands with Kiedis only response on the situation being "I love the Rolling Stones". The Four Seasons and The Rolling Stones management said the guard did not work for them however speculated he was a local guard hired to supplement their regular security team. Moments after the scuffle, the Rolling Stones exited the building to their awaiting limos.

Chad Smith death threats
On November 8, 2013, while the band was in Brazil, the band's drummer, Chad Smith made an appearance at a drum clinic where he was presented with a soccer jersey a local Brazilian Flamengo team. Smith, who was appearing in the city of the team's hated rival, proceeded to jokingly place the jersey down his pants and threw it on the floor. Fans in attendance responded with boos and one person even threw an object at Smith, barely missing his head. Smith attempted to calm the crowd down telling them he was kidding and the only place that it's OK to hate something or someone is in sports. Following his appearance, fans took to the internet including YouTube in outrage over Smith's joke feeling it was completely disrespectful. Some fans issued more dangerous threats towards Smith by saying would be killed or pelted with grenades or rocks onstage when the band performed in Brazil. Smith issued a statement through Twitter starting "'I want to apologize for my inappropriate antics at the drum clinic, my joke about team rivalries went too far. Flamengo fans...I'm sorry" The post was accompanied by pictures of Smith wearing the Flamengo team jersey along with hanging out signing autographs for the team's supporters in attempts to further smooth over the situation. Smith even promised to wear the jersey for 24 hours and personally visit the team to apologize to the players. The band performed the following night without any problems.

Super Bowl XLVIII performance controversy
On January 10, 2014, it was announced that the band would be joining Bruno Mars as part of the Super Bowl XLVIII halftime show on February 2, 2014.

When asked about what the band would perform, Smith jokingly stated it would be Led Zeppelin's "Dazed and Confused". Many in the media however did not understand the joke (Led Zeppelin's song is usually 12–30 minutes long when performed) and started reporting that they would perform the song with Mars. Smith had to clear up the confusion by saying "People in the media are so gullible sometimes. We will, however, be performing side one of Rush's 2112." Flea also made a joke about the Super Bowl performance through his Twitter page asking fans "Anybody wanna see my cock at the Super Bowl?" The Tweet was quickly removed but not before the media picked up on it, started reporting on his Tweet to which Flea was forced to respond by saying the Tweet was misleading and he has no plans of getting naked during the performance. The band is expected to join Mars onstage and appear for 3 minutes during his set. Smith said "There's no pressure on us. It's his gig. We're just gonna crash his gig for like three minutes and then we pop up and things blow up."

On February 1, 2014, the band performed at a special pre-Super Bowl XLVIII concert in Brooklyn, New York. This was the band's first show in New York since May 2003 during their By the Way tour.

During the halftime show, the Chili Peppers joined Mars onstage for a three-minute performance of "Give It Away". Mars and the Chili Peppers generated 2.2 million tweets during the 12-minute performance, many from celebrities. Reviews of the performance were mixed for both artists. Some even commenting on Kiedis' shirtless body and age with some amazed with how good he looked, while some felt he was too old to go shirtless. A lot of complaints from the media, viewers and even fellow musicians were directed towards Flea and Klinghoffer who were accused of faking their performance because their instruments were not plugged in. Flea responded to the complaints through the band's website by saying "When we were asked by the NFL and Bruno to play our song "Give It Away" at the Super Bowl, it was made clear to us that the vocals would be live, but the bass, drums, and guitar would be pre-recorded. I understand the NFL's stance on this, given they only have a few minutes to set up the stage, there a zillion things that could go wrong and ruin the sound for the folks watching in the stadium and the t.v. viewers. There was not any room for argument on this, the NFL does not want to risk their show being botched by bad sound, period. For the actual performance, Josh, Chad, and I were playing along with the pre recorded track (which was recorded earlier that week) so there was no need to plug in our guitars, so we did not. Could we have plugged them in and avoided bumming people out who have expressed disappointment that the instrument track was pre recorded?  Of course easily we could have and this would be a non-issue.  We thought it better to not pretend.  It seemed like the realest thing to do in the circumstance. We decided that, with Anthony singing live, that we could still bring the spirit and freedom of what we do into the performance, and of course we played every note in the recording specially for the gig." Chad Smith responded to the controversy through his Twitter page a few days later saying "FYI... Every band in the last 10 years at the Super Bowl has performed to a previously recorded track. It's the NFL 's policy. Period." Klinghoffer said in an April 2014 interview that out of the four members, Smith was most against performing this way. The band even received some complaints from fans who contacted the U.S. Federal Communications Commission. Some wrote or called in about how they were actually offended by shirtless men and how both men and women should remained clothed because children were watching.

The halftime show set a record for the most watched halftime performance in Super Bowl history. The show pulled in 115.3 million viewers, better than Beyoncé did in 2013 with 110.8 million and shattering the previous halftime record Madonna set in 2012 with 114 million watching. The Super Bowl was also the most watched television show in U.S. history.

Tour overview
Song selections for the setlists have not changed from the previous tour. Nothing new has been added to the setlists and songs from the I'm with You and the previous three albums along with Blood Sugar Sex Magik make up most of the material performed, which are mostly filled with the band's hits and better known songs. The most a setlist changed was during the band's April 2, 2014, performance at Lollapalooza in Argentina in which "The Power of Equality", typically a song performed during encores, opened the set for the first time ever while "If You Have to Ask", normally a mid-set song, was played during the encore. One show later, "Higher Ground" made its first ever appearance as a show opener. "Me and My Friends" and "Higher Ground" remain the only two songs from the band's 1980s albums to be performed making it the smallest selection of songs from that era to date for any of the band's tours. Even the teases of older songs from the band's catalog performed by Josh Klinghoffer have mostly been absent. Also as with most of the previous tours, shows have lasted a little under two hours with 16–18 songs performed. "Encore", a song that would be featured on the band's 2016 album, The Getaway, originally started out as an instrumental jam and was performed for the first time on this tour.

This tour marked the last time "Meet Me at the Corner" and "Monarchy of Roses" have been performed live as of 2019.

Tour dates

Festivals and other miscellaneous performances
This concert was a part of "Orion Music + More"
This concert was a part of "Firefly Music Festival"
This concert was a part of the "Outside Lands Music and Arts Festival"
This concert was a part of "Music Midtown"
This concert is a benefit for the Silverlake Conservatory of Music hosted by Kiedis and Flea and including a performance by Neil Young
This concert was private and held at the home of Chip Wilson
This concert is part of "Circuito Banco do Brasil"
This concert is part of WFAN'S Big Hello To Brooklyn Super Bowl XLVIII concert
This concert is part of the Super Bowl XLVIII halftime show
This concert is part of 7107 International Music Festival
This concert is part of "Lollapalooza"
This concert is part of "Festival Estéreo Picnic"
This performance was a three-song set on The Tonight Show Starring Jimmy Fallon
This concert if part of the Isle of Wight Festival

Box office score data

Songs performed

Originals

Cover songs

Personnel
Flea – bass, backing vocals
Anthony Kiedis – lead vocals
Josh Klinghoffer – guitar, backing vocals
Chad Smith – drums, percussion

Additional musicians
Mauro Refosco – percussion
Chris Warren – keyboards

Guest musicians
Bruno Mars + backing band – co-lead vocals, backing musicians (during the Super Bowl halftime show performance of "Give it Away")
Will Ferrell – cowbell (on "Don't Fear the Reaper" during Tonight Show appearance)
The Roots – backing musicians (on "Standing on the Verge of Getting it On" during the Tonight Show appearance)
Jimmy Fallon – backing vocals (on "Standing on the Verge of Getting it On" during the Tonight Show appearance)

External links
Red Hot Chili Peppers website
The Side: Red Hot Chili Peppers Touring History

References

2013 concert tours
2014 concert tours
Red Hot Chili Peppers concert tours